"H•A•M" is a song by American rappers Jay-Z and Kanye West. It was released as the first single from their collaborative studio album Watch the Throne on January 11, 2011. It was produced by Lexus "Lex Luger" Lewis and Kanye West. The song has served as the opening track to the duo's Watch the Throne Tour. Various rap artists have remixed it, such as Ace Hood and Busta Rhymes. The song was featured in the 2012 film Project X. It peaked at No. 23 on Billboard Hot 100.

Background
Lex Luger told Mixtape Daily how the song came about:

In an interview with HuffPost opera singer Aude Cardona explained how she came to be featured on the song, stating that she received a random call from West's manager, who told her that West needed an opera singer for his album with Jay-Z. Elsewhere, she said that she recorded in the Mercer Hotel for seven hours, and a lot of what she did was her own improvisation, as opposed to the male singer on the song.

Reception

Fellow rapper and producer Swizz Beatz commented positively on the song, saying, "I think that those being both of my friends, and knowing that people can team up on such a high caliber level as musicians, as rappers, as friends, as peers I think it's super positive, and I think that if more of the industry did moves like this it would be a better place for everybody." "H•A•M" received mixed reviews from critics. The song received a three out of five star review from Jody Rosen of Rolling Stone. Kevin O'Donnell of Spin praised the song by saying, "Kanye's latest, My Beautiful Dark Twisted Fantasy, was the most epic album of 2010 and the rapper's ambitions haven't eased up one bit here. The track morphs into the weirdest sounding opera ever, with a female singing window-shattering trills over a gospel piano progression and the song's hard-hitting beat."

In an interview with Miami radio station 99 Jamz, Jay-Z spoke about the song; 
"H.A.M." is super intense, you don't want to hear that every day. It's difficult to hear that. Inside a whole body work, it's different. Like when we perform "H.A.M." live it's a whole different experience, it reacts like it was this massive hit record. Because that's the setting or it. The setting for it is a concert, not inside your home."

Remixes
Busta Rhymes made a remix to the song. Roscoe Dash also did a freestyle to it for the intro to his "Dash Effect" Mixtape. Also freestyles have been made by Lupe Fiasco, Lil' Kim, Chingy, 40 Cal, Papoose, Emilio Rojas, Ace Hood, Lil Wyte (who renamed it "Porter House") and XV (who renamed the song "Heroes Amongst Men").

Chart performance
On January 19, 2011, "H•A•M" made its debut on the US Billboard Hot 100 at number 23 and on the US Billboard Hot Digital Songs at number 10, with digital sales of 125,000 units.

Credits and personnel
Produced by Lex Luger
Co-produced by Kanye West
Additional production by Mike Dean
Recorded by Noah Goldstein (assisted by Matt Arnold) at Real World Studios and (The Mercer) Hotel
Mixed by Mike Dean at (The Mercer) Hotel
Cello: Christopher "Hitchcock" Chorney
Cello arrangement: Mike Dean
Additional vocals: Aude Cardona and Jacob Lewis Smith
Creative direction: Ricardo Tisci

Charts

Weekly charts

Year-end charts

Certifications

Radio and release history

References

2011 singles
Jay-Z songs
Kanye West songs
Hardcore hip hop songs
Trap music songs
Roc-A-Fella Records singles
Roc Nation singles
Def Jam Recordings singles
Song recordings produced by Lex Luger (musician)
Song recordings produced by Kanye West
Song recordings produced by Mike Dean (record producer)
Songs written by Jay-Z
Songs written by Kanye West
Songs written by Lex Luger (musician)